"B.O.B" ("Bombs Over Baghdad") is a song by American rap duo Outkast from their fourth studio album Stankonia (2000). It was released as the album's lead single on August 29, 2000, through LaFace Records and Arista Records. Produced by Earthtone III, the song features a high-speed tempo beat consisting of drum and bass rhythms, guitars, organs, and gospel vocals. Although not a huge commercial success, the song has been cited as one of the greatest songs of all time by publications such as Pitchfork, Rolling Stone, Blender and Complex. The song became popular during the Iraq War.

Composition
Produced by Outkast and Mr. DJ under the name Earthtone III, "B.O.B" features "jittery drum'n'bass rhythms" and has been classified as a "stylistic tour de force" combining "Hendrix-ian" guitars, organs, and gospel vocals. On the track, André 3000 and Big Boi employ a "frantic" flow in order to keep pace with the song's high-speed tempo, which runs at 155 beats per minute.

Big Boi said that they wanted to differ from current music: "Everybody's been doing music like they all have the same formula — e = mc2. They get a beat, an MC, somebody to sing the hook, and go platinum. Where's music going to go when everybody's trapped in this same repetitious flow?"

Release
In addition to the regular release, there is also a clean version available in the video game Mat Hoffman's Pro BMX, which removed expletives such as "hell" and references to recreational drug use to allow the game to receive an "E for Everyone" rating.

Reception
"B.O.B" peaked at number 69 on the US Billboard R&B/Hip-Hop Songs chart and number 61 on the UK Singles Chart. However, many urban Top 40 radio stations banned the single due to its title and the subject matter it was assumed to have. The single was named by several music publications as one of the best songs of the 2000s. Rolling Stone ranked it 21st on their "100 Best Songs of the 2000s list, 50th on their "The 50 Greatest Hip Hop Songs of All Time" list, and 39th on their "500 Greatest Songs of All Time". Pitchfork ranked it first on their "The Top 200 Tracks of the 2000s" list. Bested only by Michael Jackson's "Billie Jean", it was ranked second on Blenders "The 500 Greatest Songs Since You Were Born" list. Complex ranked it third on their "The 100 Best Songs of the 2000s" list. The Ringer and The Guardian both ranked the song number one on their lists of the greatest Outkast songs.

The song garnered near universal acclaim from music critics. Nathan Brackett of Rolling Stone said: "The furious 'B.O.B.' is a blast of up-tempo, turn-of-the-century dislocation with electro breaks and a gospel choir. 'Power music, electric revival,' chants the choir at the end, sounding like some funkified Southern congregation where Chuck D is the preacher and Afrika Bambaataa is the musical director." Louis Arp of Sputnikmusic called the song a "drum ‘n bass assault at a frantic pace with perhaps one of the best guitar solos in hip hop history" and the duo's "rapid-fire delivery" "perhaps the most astonishing thing about this track". Tony Green of The Village Voice called it Outkast's "strongest retort to the 'bounce and more bounce' crowd, just about the damnedest bass track ever" and an "electro workout reimagined as a praise-and-worship service". Aishah Hight of PopMatters said its "fast tempo, complemented by the chant 'Bombs over Baghdad', makes this song edgy, animated, and entertaining." Saron Baker of Yahoo! Music said that it "explodes in revved-up adrenaline".

In 2009, Stuart Berman of Pitchfork named "B.O.B" the best song of the 2000s, saying "B.O.B. is not just the song of the decade--it is the decade." Pitchforks review called the song a "fast-forwarded highlight-reel prophecy of what the next 10 years held in store."

Music video
The music video for "B.O.B" was directed by Dave Meyers. Shmoop said it "combines all of your typical elements of a hip-hop music video, namely the girls, the cars, and the bling, except this video is on psychedelics.  This is a good point of comparison to see just how much Outkast has changed both musically, artistically, and stylistically over the course of their career."

Impact
The song became increasingly popular during the Iraq War in 2003. Many radio stations increased its airplay and U.S. troops were using it as a battle cry. During the 2003 NASDAQ-100 Open, tennis player Jennifer Capriati requested it to be played. Both members of Outkast have clarified they opposed the invasion, with Big Boi wishing that the U.S. government consulted the United Nations before taking action and Andre 3000 stating that the half-hearted bombings are a metaphor for lack of dedication in the music industry.

Iggy Azalea's 2013 single "Work" was inspired by the chord progression in "B.O.B". The single's music video also paid homage to the visual elements of the "B.O.B" music video.
The Janelle Monáe songs "Many Moons" and "Cold War" were both influenced by the drum pattern of "B.O.B".

The song was featured in the video game Saints Row IV, and in the movie Scoob!.

In October 2020 it was announced that Zack de la Rocha's remix of the song would appear on a 20th-anniversary rerelease of Stankonia  later the same year. This remix, which was made in Fall of 2000, was originally released to rock radio. It has also appeared on file sharing sites as a remix credited to Rage Against the Machine, de la Rocha's band.

Track listing

US CD single
 "B.O.B" (radio mix) – 4:18
 "B.O.B" (instrumental) – 5:05
 "B.O.B" (callout research hook) – 0:10
 "B.O.B" (music video) - 3:23

UK DVD single
 "B.O.B" (video) – 4:26
 "Ms. Jackson" (video) – 4:18
 "What Is Stankonia?" – 10:00

Europe CD single
 "B.O.B" (UK radio edit) – 4:14
 "B.O.B" (album version) – 5:05
 "B.O.B" (CD-ROM video) – 4:26

US vinyl single
Side A
 "B.O.B" (radio mix) – 4:18
 "B.O.B" (instrumental) – 5:05
Side B
 "B.O.B" (club mix) – 5:04
 "B.O.B" (a cappella) – 2:58

UK vinyl single
A  "B.O.B" (album version) – 5:05
B  "B.O.B" (instrumental) – 5:05

Europe enhanced CD single
 "B.O.B" (UK radio edit) – 3:42
 "B.O.B" (album version) – 5:05
 "B.O.B" (enhanced video) – 4:26

Personnel 

 André 3000 – vocals, backing vocals
Big Boi – vocals 
Morris Brown College Gospel Choir – backing vocals 
Earthtone III – keyboards, producer, arranger 
Kennet Wright – keyboards  
Matt Still – keyboards  
Nein H. Pogue – arranger 
David Whild -guitar  
Donny Mathis – guitar 
Cutmaster Swiff – cuts

Charts

Weekly charts

Year-end charts

Certifications

Release history

See also
 List of anti-war songs

References

2000 singles
2000 songs
Music videos directed by Dave Meyers (director)
Outkast songs
Songs written by André 3000
Songs written by Big Boi
Rap rock songs
Songs about Iraq
Drum and bass songs
LaFace Records singles
Arista Records singles